Tekken Tag Tournament 2 is a sequel to the Tekken fighting game series. It was released for the arcades in September 2011. It received an update, subtitled Unlimited, on March 2012. A console version based on the update was released for PlayStation 3 and Xbox 360 in September 2012, prior to the update. It was ported to the Wii U as one of the system's launch titles in November 2012, subtitled Wii U Edition. It is the eighth installment in the Tekken fighting game series.

As with the original Tekken Tag Tournament (1999), the game includes almost every character from past Tekken games, giving it the largest playable roster in a Tekken game to date. Players can choose either a team of two characters on each side or a solo character. Tekken Tag Tournament 2 has been positively received by critics, earning averaged review scores in the range of 82-83% at both GameRankings and Metacritic for the PlayStation 3, Wii U and Xbox 360 versions, as well as several fighting-game-of-the-year awards.

Gameplay

Like the original Tekken Tag Tournament, matches involve each player selecting two fighters to fight with. Players are able to switch their fighters out at any time, allowing the inactivating character to gradually recover some life they might have lost. At certain points, an inactive character's life bar may flash, giving them a temporary boost in strength if they are tagged in. If the life bar of either of a player's fighters runs out, that player loses the round. If time runs out, the player who has the most cumulative life remaining amongst their fighters wins the round.

The gameplay expands on the tag mechanics featured in the first Tekken Tag, allowing for extended tag combos and combined moves. New techniques include combined tag throws which, if timed properly, can be escaped from. Tag combos (referred to as "Tag Assaults") can be done simultaneously with both characters participating in the combo at the same time. The game inherits gameplay features from Tekken 6, such as "Bound" hits (hits that slam an airborne opponent to the ground and stun them so combos can be extended) and walled arenas, some of which featuring walls and floors that can be broken through during the fight. Character customization is also featured, similar to past Tekken games.

Features suggested by Katsuhiro Harada include recording in Practice mode as well as a Tutorial, to make the game more accessible for new players. The game features a "stage gimmick" system. For instance, an example of the system shown has the player slamming their opponent into wall, which breaks and the opponent goes flying, landing in a new area where the fight continues. As the opponent falls, the tag partner is waiting at the bottom to continue the combo.

The game features various modes, allowing players to choose between Tag Team (2 vs 2), Single (1 vs 1), or Handicap Matches ( 2 vs 1 or 1 vs 2), options for four players to play in a single match, and various online modes. Along with returning modes such as Arcade, Versus, Team Battle, Time Attack and Survival, a new mode called Fight Lab allows players to train a Combot through various challenges. The game also features various items that can alter the gameplay, ranging from weapons such as firearms and hammer hats to superficial items such as specialized KOs, and allows players to customize their fighters with various accessories.

The Wii U Edition includes the return of the mini-game Tekken Ball from Tekken 3 and a Mushroom Battle mode in which various mushrooms from the Mario series litter the arena, causing players to grow or shrink in size or take extra damage.  It also features optional touch-based controls using the system's gamepad, as well as costumes based on Nintendo media franchise. There is also another exclusive mode called Tekken Supporters, where players can donate their in game currency to the characters for items you can't get in the Customization mode or bonuses earned from Ghost Battle.

Plot
Unlike the original Tekken Tag Tournament, the game's sequel features a storyline although it is still not the series canon. However, certain characters' endings are canon, which are followed in the sequel game Tekken 7. In the story, Heihachi Mishima has developed a rejuvenation serum, which has the ability to regress his appearance and power. After consuming it, Heihachi hosts another King of Iron Fist Tournament, sensing powerful challengers who would come to the tournament.

In "Fight Lab" section of the game, Lee Chaolan, under the guise of Violet is working on a new version of Combot. As soon as Combot is complete, Violet begins its simulation test. After the simulation test, the Combot explodes and destroys the lab. Violet decides to use the other functioning Combot to complete the tests. After Combot completes five tests, Violet kidnaps Jin, Kazuya and Heihachi for Combot's final test. Combot apparently has the upper hand, but Jin transforms into his Devil form and destroys it. Violet blows up the Combot, presumably taking the Mishima bloodline with it, and says, "Excellent!".

Characters

The arcade version features all 41 playable characters from Tekken 6 (including Panda except with her own character slot) along with Jun Kazama from Tekken 2, True Ogre (known in-game as just "Ogre") from Tekken 3 and Jinpachi Mishima from Tekken 5 all with updated character designs. Devil Kazuya from the original Tekken also makes an appearance as an in-game transformation of Kazuya. Unknown from the original Tekken Tag Tournament also returns, once again as an unplayable final boss with an updated set of visuals. In the home release, she became a playable character via an update patch. The game also introduces a masked character named Jaycee, an alter-ego of Julia Chang.

The console release of the game features a total of 59 characters, including the return of Kunimitsu, Michelle Chang and Prototype Jack from the original Tekken, Angel and Alex from Tekken 2, Tiger Jackson, Forest Law, Dr. Bosconovitch and Ancient Ogre (originally known as just "Ogre") from Tekken 3, as well as Tekken 4'''s Miharu Hirano, Violet and Combot, the latter of which can be customized with various moves from other characters. A slim version of Bob from his Tekken 6 ending and Lili's butler since Tekken 5: Dark Resurrection, Sebastian make their debut as playable characters.

Unlike previous installments, certain characters who originally did not speak in their native language, now do. Characters include Lili and Sebastian who speak French, Eddy and Christie speaking Portuguese, Dr. Bosconovitch speaking Russian, Leo speaking German and Miguel speaking Spanish. Exceptions include Lee Chaolan, Lars, Xiaoyu, and Alisa, who still speak Japanese, as well as Lei and Lee's alter-ego Violet, who still speaks English due to their further character backgrounds despite their actual nationalities.

New characters
Jaycee: A luchador fighter and Julia Chang's alter-ego.
Sebastian : Lili's old butler, who usually appeared in Lili’s endings since their debut in Tekken 5: Dark Resurrection.
Slim Bob : A slim version of Bob, who first appeared in Bob’s Tekken 6 ending.
Super Combot DX  : An upgrade version of Combot.

Recurring characters

 Console-exclusive character 
 Free downloadable content in console version 
 Unavailable in online play 
 Unplayable in arcade-version 
 In-battle transformation 
 Unlockable in Wii U version 
 Only playable in Fight Lab mode for the prologue. 

DevelopmentTekken series producer Katsuhiro Harada teased an announcement on his Twitter feed on September 17, 2010 ("TGS Sep 18(Sat) at Tougeki Booth. I'll announce something :D"). It was rumored to be something related to Tekken X Street Fighter or Tekken 7. The game was announced to be Tekken Tag Tournament 2, sequel to Tekken Tag Tournament, on September 18, 2010, at the Tougeki event as promised. Producer Katsuhiro Harada stated that the game engine would be different from the one used in Tekken 6. The release of the arcade version of the game in Japan was originally planned for summer 2011, but due to complications derived from the Great East Japan earthquake, the arcade release was postponed until Autumn 2011. At the World Cyber Games 2010, Harada stated that the console version would feature additional console-exclusive returning characters and bonus gameplay modes. He also suggested that the release of the console version of the game would take place between the releases of Street Fighter X Tekken and Tekken X Street Fighter.

Tekken Tag Tournament 2 UnlimitedTekken Tag Tournament 2 Unlimited is an update to original arcade release, Tekken Tag Tournament 2. It features a number of new items and customization options. It also gives the game a balance update from characters and items. It was released to arcades on March 27, 2012, and the console version of Tekken Tag Tournament 2 is based on this arcade version.

In the Unlimited version, the player can switch a ratio between Tag mode and Solo mode ("2 vs 2", "1 vs 2" or "1 vs 1"). There is also a Pair Play mode, which allows four players to fight simultaneously in pairs of two, much like the "Scramble Mode" in Street Fighter X Tekken. The Unlimited version features the Rage system from Tekken 6 for Solo mode characters, and the new tag partner Rage system from the original arcade version of Tag Tournament 2 for Tag mode characters only. Rage gives characters more damage per hit when their vitality is below a certain point. Once activated, a reddish energy aura appears around the character, and their health bar starts to flicker in red. The Netsu Power appears when an on-screen character gets attacked a certain number of times and the off-screen character's lifebar flashes. If the on-screen character tags out while the off-screen character's lifebar is flashing, the tagged character becomes slightly stronger.

Console versions
The console version of Tekken Tag Tournament 2 was released for the PlayStation 3 and Xbox 360 in September 2012, and for the Wii U in November–December 2012. The console version is based on the Unlimited version, and features new characters in addition to the 44 already in the arcade version of the game, as well as new stages and a new Practice Mode called "Fight Lab" featuring Combot as a customizable training dummy. The "Fight Lab" mode serve as a practicing ground for both beginners and advanced players with customizable bots.

Both the PlayStation 3 and Xbox 360 versions of Tekken Tag Tournament 2 support stereoscopic 3D, the effects of which can be customized. There is a new feature called "Tekken Tunes", which allows players to swap music around the game and import their own music. Additionally, there is a new online service called "World Tekken Federation" that allows players to keep track of their overall stats and even which moves they had used in a match. Players can create teams, compete in online competitions, and discuss game-related topics in forums. A real-time worldwide leaderboard is also included.

A digital version of Tekken Tag Tournament 2 was released on the PlayStation Network in North America on November 13, 2012, and was released in Europe on November 21, 2012. A version for Xbox Live followed in late December.

The Wii U Edition features exclusive content, including a game mode that uses power-ups from Nintendo's Super Mario series, such as Mega Mushrooms and Poison Mushrooms, the return of the minigame "Tekken Ball" from Tekken 3, an optional touch-based control scheme utilizing the Wii U GamePad controller, and character costumes based on popular Nintendo series, including Super Mario, Metroid, Star Fox, F-Zero and The Legend of Zelda. In addition to the exclusive content, the DLC characters, outfits, and stages from the Xbox 360 and PlayStation 3 versions are all included from the start in the Wii U Edition.

Originally, when the Wii U console was first shown at the E3 2011 in Los Angeles, Namco announced that they would develop a Tekken game for the Wii U, which was untitled at the time. However, at E3 2012, it was announced that Tekken Tag Tournament 2 would come to the Wii U, which was already going to come to the PlayStation 3 and Xbox 360. Tekken Tag Tournament 2: Wii U Edition is amongst the first third-party Wii U games that is available in both retail and as a downloadable format for the Nintendo eShop. In Japan, the downloadable version is available for a slightly lower price than the retail format.

Music
The soundtrack to Tekken Tag Tournament 2 was composed by Akitaka Tohyama, Nobuyoshi Sano, Keiichi Okabe, Rio Hamamoto, Taku Inoue, and Go Shiina.

The console versions have additional songs composed by Akitaka Tohyama, Taku Inoue, Yoshihito Yano, Ryo Watanabe, Go Shiina, Rio Hamamoto, Nobuyoshi Sano, Keiichi Okabe, Shinji Hosoe, Ayako Saso, Yuu Miyake, and Keigo Hoashi.

Snoop Dogg recorded a track for the game, titled Knocc Em Down. When asked about the collaboration, director Katsuhiro Harada said "the Tekken team has always tried to implement different genres of music throughout the series, but one thing that we’ve never done was hip hop or rap,". The game also had a Snoop Dogg themed stage in which the rapper made a cameo.

Release

Marketing

The Tekken Hybrid Blu-ray Disc collection, released on November 22, 2011, contains the Tekken: Blood Vengeance CGI animated film and an HD version of the original Tekken Tag Tournament, as well as a demo version of Tekken Tag Tournament 2, called Tekken Tag Tournament 2 Prologue for the PlayStation 3. The contents of the prologue mainly revolve around elements of the movie, and features four characters: Alisa Bosconovitch, Devil Jin, Devil Kazuya and Ling Xiaoyu, all of whom feature new costumes (the school uniform for Alisa and Xiaoyu, and the new Devil design from the movie for Devil Jin and Devil Kazuya).

Prior to the release of Tekken Tag Tournament 2, Namco Bandai Games allowed players in North America for the first time to try the game at the Team Mad Catz booth during the 2012 MLG Winter Championships event. Namco brought Tekken Tag Tournament 2 arcade machines to MCM London Comic Con. On June 25, 2012, Namco announced the First-Play Tour, a UK tour designed to let newcomers play the game's Fight Lab mode ahead of the game's release. The tour began at London Trocadero on June 28, and headed to Manchester on July 5 and Glasgow on July 6. On September 11, 2012, Namco attempt a new world record for "largest screen used in a videogame tournament". The attempt took place at Sydney's IMAX theatre.

To celebrate the launch of Tekken Tag Tournament 2, Namco launched a competition to find the best Tekken inspired images. The competition played on the "Tag" element of the game, with fans from around the globe being asked to use Instagram to tag photos with #WEARETEKKEN or #TTT2 that show what Tekken means to them. The favorite photos were selected to go on display at the East Gallery in London to celebrate the games launch on September 14, 2012. One over-all winner, picked by "We Are Tekken" artist Vince Ray, received a Tekken prize bundle including a We Are Tekken edition of the game, Kotobukiya's Yoshimitsu statue (limited to 500), "We are Tekken" gamer shirt, Tekken Tag Tournament 2 bowling bag and Vince Ray's Anna Williams poster signed by Harada.

Retail editions
In the U.S., people that pre-ordered Tekken Tag 2 from GameStop would receive the downloadable content (DLC) for Angel and Kunimitsu as well as the bikini outfits, the Snoop Dogg stage and a 'girl power' poster of Nina and Anna Williams. In Australia, on day one of Tekken Tag Tournament 2s launch, customers that placed their pre-orders with selected retailers had access to the exclusive ANZ Edition, which includes a Metal Tin case with exclusive artwork, the additional four DLC characters, the "Snoop Dogg Stage" and over 150 in-game swimsuit outfits. The ANZ Edition is produced in limited quantities and was available through EB Games and JB Hifi in Australia and New Zealand.

In Southeast Asia, copies of a special Prestige Edition contains a 256-page art book, two soundtrack CDs containing the original tracks and remixes, a DVD with behind-the-scenes video "Making of TTT2", and a Tekken wall-sticker signed by producer Katsuhiro Harada, packaged in a black leather box. In addition, all Southeast Asian customers who pre-ordered the game early (standard or Prestige) got an interlocking code so that players can link their Tekken Tag Tournament 2 arcade and console progress together, alongside the additional four DLC characters, the "Snoop Dogg Stage" and over 150 in-game swimsuit outfits.

In Europe, UK retailer Game secured the right to sell the We are Tekken edition of the game, available for the PlayStation 3 and Xbox 360 version of the game. The game comes packed in an exclusive metal case including the original soundtrack, an additional music CD with remixes, an art book with more than 200 pages, a behind the scenes video with series producer Katsuhiro Harada and other guests offering their best tips.

Downloadable content
In April 2012, series producer Katsuhiro Harada stated that while no characters will be paid downloadable content (DLC), those who pre-order the game at select retailers will be able to play as one or more of the four DLC characters (Ancient Ogre, Angel, Kunimitsu and Michelle Chang) at launch, but only for a limited period of time before the content is made available for free to all players.

On June 5, 2012, at E3, Namco Bandai announced a partnership with American rapper Snoop Dogg for content for Tekken Tag Tournament 2. Snoop recorded an original song for the game, titled "Knocc 'Em Down", and makes a special appearance as a non-playable character in the "Snoop Dogg Stage" offered as a free pre-order bonus. On July 14, 2012, during Comic Con, Namco announced the "Big Bikini Bundle", which includes over 150 swimsuit outfits. The swimsuit DLC includes suits for all characters: male, female and animal. The "Big Bikini Bundle" was available as a pre-order bonus in addition to the "Snoop Dogg Stage" and additional early access to DLC characters.

On September 9, 2012, some players found on-disc data for six hidden characters (Dr. Bosconovitch, Miharu Hirano, Sebastian, Slim Bob, Violet and Unknown) and a few hidden stages. Namco announced them on September 12, 2012, stating that starting on October 9, 2012, these six characters, in addition to four new stages (Extravagant Underground, Moai Excavation, Modern Oasis and Odeum of Illusions) to be available for download. The content was announced to be staggered across several free updates, rather than in one major update. The characters Miharu Hirano, Sebastian and Slim Bob, as well as all four new stages, Online World Arena mode and decals for customization, were released on October 9, 2012, as a free update. Dr. Bosconovitch, Violet and Unknown, as well as the four pre-order characters, were released on November 13. In addition to the extra DLC characters, a patch was released which drastically altered the difficulty of Arcade mode.

Music and cutscenes from all previous Tekken games for use in "Tekken Tunes" was also announced be released as DLC, titled the "Tekken Tag 2 Bonus Pack". Music from the original Tekken, Tekken 2, Tekken 3 and Tekken Tag Tournament were released on October 9, 2012, and the music from Tekken 4, Tekken 5 and Tekken 6 was released on October 23, 2012. The ending movie packs from the former four games were released the same day. Movies from the latter three games were released on November 20, 2012. Unlike character and pre-order DLC, the music and ending movies come with a fee that is cheaper if the content is downloaded in packs rather than separately.

ReceptionTekken Tag Tournament 2 has been met with a positive critical response, with aggregating review website Metacritic assigning the Wii U version 83/100, Xbox 360 version 83/100 and PlayStation 3 version 82/100. During its first month of sale, it shifted 840,000 copies in Europe and Japan. As of January 2013, 1.35 million copies have been sold worldwide. By March 2013 the game had sold 1.5 million copies worldwide. The game reached number 2 in the UK sales charts.

In Famitsu, the game scored a rating of 39/40 for the PlayStation 3 and Xbox 360 versions, which was the magazine's highest score for a traditional fighting game since Dead or Alive 4 in 2005. Joystiq applauded the game for including everything that makes Tekken good, stating "its surprisingly deep, accessible gameplay mechanics to its bombastic and hilarious attitude – all presented in a package more polished and refined than ever before." GameSpot hailed this "well-executed and punishing fighter" for its combat system, online play, the Fight Lab mode, and customizable soundtrack, but criticized the inadequate tutorial modes. According to Eurogamer, "It plays it a little safe in places and lacks a truly killer single-player mode, but by broadening the versatility of the tag system while dramatically improving the online functionality, Namco has crafted a new teamwork seminar that builds upon the original in almost all the areas that matter." IGN was more critical of the game that while approving the core gameplay and content, felt that the similar gameplay of its predecessors made it difficult for newcomers of the series. Game Informer noted that the game does not overhaul the franchise, but retains the series' already solid gameplay, adding: "It offers a ton of fighters, the tag system is interesting, it plays well online, and it preserves the goofy sense of humor that defines the series. Even with a somewhat bare-bones online offering, it’s still one of the most refined fighters on the market." GameTrailers wrote: "Spinoff or not, this is the best Tekken game in years."

AwardsTekken Tag Tournament 2 was one of the four games nominated at the 2012 Spike TV Video Game Awards in the category "Best Fighting Game", losing to Persona 4 Arena. GameSpot awarded Tekken Tag Tournament 2'' "Fighting Game of 2012",

Notes

References

External links

 
  
 Tekken Tag Tournament 2 at MobyGames
 Tekken Tag Tournament 2: Wii U Edition at MobyGames

2011 video games
Arcade video games
Dinosaurs in video games
Fighting games used at the Evolution Championship Series tournament
Fighting games used at the Super Battle Opera tournament
Multiplayer online games
Tag team videogames
Nintendo Network games
PlayStation 3 games
Science fiction video games
Fighting games
Video games about size change
Video game sequels
Video games developed in Japan
Video games scored by Go Shiina
Video games scored by Keiichi Okabe
Video games scored by Shinji Hosoe
Video games set in Brazil
Video games set in Canada
Video games set in China
Video games set in Chile
Video games set in Colombia
Video games set in Dubai
Video games set in Fiji
Video games set in Finland
Video games set in France
Video games set in Germany
Video games set in Indonesia
Video games set in Italy
Video games set in Japan
Video games set in the Netherlands
Video games set in Norway
Video games set in the Philippines
Video games set in Poland
Video games set in Russia
Video games set in Saudi Arabia
Video games set in Spain
Video games set in Tokyo
Video games set in the United Kingdom
Video games set in the United States
Wii U games
Wii U eShop games
Xbox 360 games
Multiplayer and single-player video games
Video games using Havok
Tag Tournament 2